To cry wolf means to raise a false alarm, derived from the fable The Boy Who Cried Wolf.

Cry Wolf may also refer to:

Music 
 Cry Wolf (band), a heavy metal band
 Cry Wolf (album), their first album
 "Cry Wolf" (A-ha song), a 1986 song
 "Cry Wolf" (Laura Branigan song), a 1987 song later covered by Stevie Nicks
 Cry Wolf (Cavo song), an album by Cavo
 "Cry Wolf", a song by Venom from the 1983 album At War with Satan
 "Cry Wolf", a song by Lisa Germano from the 1994 album Geek the Girl
 "Cry Wolf", a song by Jonathan Thulin from the 2015 album Science Fiction (Jonathan Thulin album)

Film and television 
 Cry Wolf (1947 film), starring Errol Flynn and Barbara Stanwyck
 Cry Wolf (1968 film), a British film produced by the Children's Film Foundation
 Cry Wolf (2005 film), starring Julian Morris and Lindy Booth
 "Cry Wolf" (The Professionals), 1983 television episode
 "Cry Wolf" (Thunderbirds episode), an episode of the television series Thunderbirds
 "Cry Wolf!", an episode of the television series Fireman Sam
 "Cry Wolf!", an episode of the television series The Raccoons

Literature 
 Cry Wolf (novel), a 1976 novel by Wilbur Smith
 Cry Wolf (2008 novel), a 2008 fantasy novel by Patricia Briggs
 Cry Wolf (2020 book), non-fiction book by Harold R. Johnson

Video games 
 "Cry Wolf", the last episode of the game The Wolf Among Us

See also
 Cry Wolfe, an American television show
 Never Cry Wolf, 1963 autobiographical work by Farley Mowat
 Never Cry Wolf (film), its film adaptation
 The Cry of the Wolf, 1990 novel by Melvin Burgess
 Don't Cry Wolf (disambiguation)
 Crying Wolf, a 2011 documentary film
 The Boy Who Cried Werewolf (disambiguation), two films of the same name